Saint Stephen's Church, popularly known as The Pepper Canister, is the formal Church of Ireland chapel-of-ease for the parish of the same name in Dublin, Ireland. The church is situated on Mount Street Upper. It was begun in 1821 by John Bowden and completed by Joseph Welland after the former's death. The nickname derives from the shape of the spire, resembling a pepper canister.

It was originally conceived as a chapel-of-ease for the parish of St Peter's, Aungier Street, which was the largest Church of Ireland parish in Dublin. In recent years, the church has become active both in faith activities and as a venue for musical and other events.

References

Churches completed in 1821
19th-century Church of Ireland church buildings
Church of Ireland churches in Dublin (city)
19th-century churches in the Republic of Ireland